Houshang Seyhoun, (August 22, 1920 – May 26, 2014) was an Iranian architect, sculptor, painter, scholar and professor. He studied fine arts at the École nationale supérieure des Beaux-Arts in Paris, and earned a degree in architecture from University of Tehran.
Seyhun is noted specially for his innovative and creative architectural design. His architectural legacy includes countless monuments and over one thousand private villas. After the Iranian Revolution he moved to Vancouver and lived in exile until his death. Seyhoon became famous for his design work in the 1950s in Iran, including: Tehran's Central Railway Station and tombs of scientific/literary figures (such as the Avicenna Mausoleum in Hamadan). He has been a faculty member of Tehran University's College of Architecture, where he also served as Dean of the College of Fine Arts (Beaux arts) of Tehran University for six years.

Life
He was born in a Baha'i family renowned in music. His grandfather, Mirza Abdollah Farahani was a pioneer in traditional music and famous as the father of traditional music of Iran. His mother, Mowloud Khanom, played Setar, and his uncle, Ahmad Ebadi, was an Ostad (Maestro) of Setar.
After finishing his studies in Architecture at Tehran University, he went to Paris to continue his education at the invitation of Andre Godard. After three years of education under the supervision of Othello Zavaroni, he received his Ph.D. in art. After returning to Iran, he created his first work at the age of 23, a memorial monument on the grave of Abu-Ali Sina.
He was a member of The National Committee of Archeology, The High Committee of Urbanization, The Central Committee of All Universities of Iran, The International Committee of Icomos, and for 15 years he was in charge of repairing historic constructions of Iran.
He believed that a good architect must like a poet be simple and easy.
His body was buried wrapped in the three-color lion-and-sun flag of Iran and A Derafsh Kaviani in a coffin in Forest Lawn's graveyard in Los Angeles.
In his will he asked that all his paintings and drawings be given to a museum in Iran.

Works
Seyhoun's work includes several monuments such as the Avicenna Mausoleum in Hamadan, Tomb of Ferdowsi and Tomb of Nader Shah in Mashhad and Omar Khayyam Mausoleum in Nishapur.

References

External links
 About Seyhoun
 Houshang Seyhoun Interview parstimes.com
 Obituary from Columbia University's Center for Iranian Studies

Iranian architects
Academic staff of the University of Tehran
Iranian painters
Iranian sculptors
Iranian Bahá'ís
1920 births
2014 deaths
Modernist architects
University of Tehran alumni
Iranian expatriates in France